German rapper Dardan has released five studio albums, four extended plays, 44 singles as a lead artist and two as a featured artist.

Albums

Studio albums

Extended plays

Singles

As lead artist

2010s

2020s

As featured artist

References

External links 

Discographies of German artists
Discographies of Albanian artists